Sammarinese Museum of Ancient Arms (Museo delle armi antiche di San Marino in Italian) is located in the Cesta, the second tower of San Marino. The museum opened in 1956 due to agreement with Sammarinese collector Giovanni Carlo Giorgetti. Exhibition, divided to four rooms, contains about 2000 ancient arms and armours. It is part of the Musei di Stato.

External links

Museums established in 1956
Museums in San Marino
History museums
1956 establishments in San Marino
Military and war museums
Buildings and structures in the City of San Marino